Ivan Djonov (born 15 July 1997) is a Macedonian handball player who plays for RK Alkaloid.

He participated at the 2017 Men's Junior World Handball Championship.

References

http://www.eurohandball.com/ec/chc/men/2015-16/player/565515/IvanDjonov
https://web.archive.org/web/20151226140037/http://ekipa.mk/tineks-prolet-potpisha-profesionalni-dogovori-so-chetvoritsa-mladi-rakometari/

1997 births
Living people
Macedonian male handball players
Sportspeople from Skopje
Mediterranean Games competitors for North Macedonia
Competitors at the 2022 Mediterranean Games